Odds Bodkin (born  February 14, 1953) is the pseudonym of an American storyteller, musician, and author who has published a number of spoken and/or musical interpretations of traditional tales, as well as a number of original tales and children's books.  "Little Proto's T-Rex Adventure" was awarded the Parents' Choice Gold Award. Odds and his family live in Bradford, New Hampshire.

Bodkin tours both nationally and internationally, appearing at storytelling festivals, schools, universities, theaters and museums.  He has performed at the White House and the National Storytelling Festival.

Recent Bodkin projects include The Vanishers: The App that Brings Objects to Life, a story-based Alternative Reality Game (ARG) for museums and outdoor places, and Young Hercules: The Legendary Bully, an empathy-awareness program for middle, high school and college students.

Under the pseudonym "McKenzie Bodkin", Bodkin's original epic poem The Water Mage's Daughter: A Novel of Love, Magic and War in Verse was published as an ebook by Telemachus Press in 2013. Written in iambic tetrameter, the 13,000-line high fantasy novel features hidden verse games and mathematical structures.

Published works
Odds Bodkin's many published works include:
 The Water Mage's Daughter: A Novel of Love, Magic and War in Verse (2013) 
 The Rage of Hercules (2001) 
 The Harper and the King
 The Evergreens: Gentle Tales of Nature
 Lifescapes: Stories of Love
 The Adventures of Little Proto
 Little Proto's T-Rex Adventure
 Little Proto and the Volcano's Fire
 With A Twinkle In Your Eye (1993) 
 Giants' Cauldron (1993) 
 Rip Roarin' Paul Bunyan Tales (1994) 
 The Odyssey (1995) 
 The Hidden Grail: Sir Percival and the Fisher King (1997) 
 The Winter Cherries (1994) 
 The Earthstone (1993) 
 Blossom Tree: Tales from the Far East
 Dark Tales of the Supernatural
 The Banshee Train (with Ted Rose) (1995) 
 The Christmas Cobwebs (2001) 
 Ghost of the Southern Belle 
 The Wise Little Girl (1993) 
 The Crane Wife (1998) 
 The Teacup Fairy (1993)

References
OddsBodkin.net

External sources
Odds Bodkin Performs Live on Plum TV

American performance artists
Duke University alumni
Living people
1953 births
American storytellers
People from Bradford, New Hampshire